Joseph John Fauliso (February 16, 1916 – August 20, 2014) was an American politician who was the 103rd lieutenant governor of Connecticut from 1980 to 1991.

Early life
Fauliso was born in Stonington, Connecticut. He studied at Providence College and then studied law at Boston University Law School. He married Ann-Marie Schwerdtfeger and they have one son, Richard.

Political career
Fauliso was an Alderman in Hartford and city and state judge before he was first elected into the Connecticut Senate in 1966. He served as President pro tempore of the Connecticut Senate. Early in 1980, he told his close friend, governor Ella T. Grasso, that he had decided not to seek reelection that year, after seven terms in the State Senate. Grasso then asked Fauliso to reconsider, because she needed him in the Senate for the final two years of her second term. He consulted with his family and close friends, and after a week told Grasso he would seek reelection. What he did not anticipate was that Grasso would resign on December 31, 1980, because she was dying from cancer. On that day, Lieutenant Governor William A. O'Neill became the new governor and Fauliso, as the newly reelected leader of the State Senate, automatically became Lieutenant Governor of Connecticut. Fauliso then stayed as lieutenant governor throughout the gubernatorial terms of O'Neill. They did not seek reelection in 1990 and served until January 9, 1991. He died in 2014 at the age of 98.

See also
List of governors of Connecticut

References

1916 births
2014 deaths
People from Stonington, Connecticut
Providence College alumni
Boston University School of Law alumni
Connecticut state court judges
Connecticut city council members
Democratic Party Connecticut state senators
Lieutenant Governors of Connecticut
Presidents pro tempore of the Connecticut Senate
20th-century American judges